Corynexochidae Angelin, 1854, is an extinct family of trilobites within the order Corynexochida Kobayashi, 1935. According to Jell and Adrain (2002)  there are at least 15 genera within the Family Corynexochidae:

Genera
 † Acontheus Angelin, 1851
 † Corynexochus Angelin, 1854
 † Stenochilina Ulrich, 1931
 † Bonnaspis Resser, 1936
 † Corynexochina Lermontova, 1940
 † Shivelicus Pokrovskaya, 1959
 † Milaspis Sivov, 1960
 † Miranella Pokrovskaya, 1960
 † Sanaschtykgolia Poletaeva, 1960
 † Corynexochella Suvorova, 1964
 † Eocorynexochus Korobeinikova, 1965
 † Abakania Poletaeva, 1973
 † Chatiania Yang, 1977
 † Clavigellus Geyer, 1994
 † Eochatiania Yuan and Yin, 1998

References

 
Articles created by Qbugbot
Trilobite families